Mulfords Run is a stream in the U.S. state of Ohio.

Mulfords Run was named in honor of a local family.

References

Rivers of Warren County, Ohio
Rivers of Ohio